Aimee Ng is a specialist in Italian Renaissance art, curator at The Frick Collection, writer and podcaster.

Career 
Ng is a curator at The Frick Collection specializing in Italian Renaissance art. She graduated from the Queen's University at Kingston, and received her PhD in art history from the Columbia University. Prior to her curatorial career, she worked for the Morgan Library and Museum and was a lecturer on art history at Columbia University. Her curatorial debut was as a guest curator of the exhibition "The Poetry of Parmigianino's 'Schava Turca'" at the Frick Collection in 2016. She was later appointed by the museum as an associate curator and subsequently as a curator. Along with Chief Curator Xavier F. Salomon, Ng oversaw the 2021 installation of the collection at the Frick Madison.

She is a contributor to The Brooklyn Rail, writing mainly about old master paintings.

Cocktails with a Curator and Travels with a Curator

From April 2020 to July 2021, Ng co-hosted the online program "Cocktails with a Curator" with chief curator Xavier F. Salomon, which examined artwork at the Frick. In this program, they provided virtual museum tours and lectures, while drinking cocktails. The Wall Street Journal characterized the program as "immensely popular" and "reaching an enormous audience". The program had 66 episodes, which are available on YouTube. Jason Farago of The New York Times wrote that their show "became appointment viewing at Friday martini hour". In 2021, Cocktails with a Curator was named an Honoree in the 25th Annual Webby Awards from the International Academy of Digital Arts and Sciences for Best Virtual & Remote Experiences: Arts & Culture and jointly awarded a Global Fine Arts Award for Best Digital Exhibition or Online Education Program.

Ng also co-hosted "Travels with a Curator", which had 20 episodes and ran from April 2020 to September 2020. They are also available on YouTube.

In 2022, the book Cocktails with a Curator, by Salomon with Ng and assistant curator of sculpture Giulio Dalvit, was published by Rizzoli Electra.

Publications 

 Catalogue accompanying exhibition at the Frick Collection.

 Catalogue accompanying exhibition at the Frick Collection.
 Salomon, Xavier, with Aimee Ng and Giulio Dalvit (2022). Cocktails with a Curator: The Frick Collection. New York: Rizzoli Electa.

References 

Living people
Year of birth missing (living people)
American art historians
Women art historians
American non-fiction writers
American women non-fiction writers
Frick Collection
American curators
21st-century American women
American women curators